In enzymology, a pyrimidine-nucleoside phosphorylase is an enzyme that catalyzes the chemical reaction

a pyrimidine nucleoside + phosphate  a pyrimidine base + alpha-D-ribose 1-phosphate

Thus, the two substrates of this enzyme are pyrimidine nucleoside and phosphate, whereas its two products are pyrimidine base and alpha-D-ribose 1-phosphate.

This enzyme belongs to the family of glycosyltransferases, specifically the pentosyltransferases.  The systematic name of this enzyme class is pyrimidine-nucleoside:phosphate alpha-D-ribosyltransferase. This enzyme is also called Py-NPase.  This enzyme participates in pyrimidine metabolism.

Structural studies

References

 Boyer, P.D., Lardy, H. and Myrback, K. (Eds.), The Enzymes, 2nd ed., vol. 5, Academic Press, New York, 1961, p. 237-255.
 
 

EC 2.4.2
Enzymes of known structure